Drupella margariticola, common name the shouldered castor bean, is a species of sea snail, a marine gastropod mollusk, in the family Muricidae, the murex snails or rock snails.

References

margariticola
Gastropods described in 1833